Ryoo Choon-za (born 11 December 1943) is a North Korean speed skater. She competed in two events at the 1964 Winter Olympics.

References

External links
 

1943 births
Living people
North Korean female speed skaters
Olympic speed skaters of North Korea
Speed skaters at the 1964 Winter Olympics
People from Hamhung